Sister Joel Read (December 30, 1925 – May 25, 2017) was an American religious sister and the president of Alverno College from 1968 until 2003.

Biography
Janice Anne Read was born on December 30, 1925, in Chicago, Illinois. She joined the School Sisters of St. Francis in 1942. Read graduated from Fordham University and Alverno College. She was one of the founding members of the National Organization for Women. She died on May 25, 2017 at the age of 91.

Academic career
Read began teaching history at Alverno College in 1955. In 1968, she was appointed to be the college's sixth president.

In 1985, she was elected to the Wisconsin Academy of Arts and Sciences. Other education boards she has served on include the Foundation for Independent Higher Education, the American Council on Education, the Association of American Colleges and Universities and the National Catholic Educational Association. In 2000, she received the Lifetime Leadership Award from the Wisconsin Women in Higher Education Leadership.

Read retired in 2003. Her tenure as president is the longest of any college president in Alverno College's history.

References

1925 births
2017 deaths
Alverno College alumni
Alverno College faculty
Heads of universities and colleges in the United States
Fordham University alumni
People from Chicago
20th-century American Roman Catholic nuns
Catholics from Illinois
Women heads of universities and colleges
American women academics
21st-century American Roman Catholic nuns
National Organization for Women people